Lomandra patens is a perennial, rhizomatous herb found in Australia.

References

patens
Asparagales of Australia
Flora of New South Wales
Flora of the Northern Territory